Light Green Line may refer to:

Transportation 

 Line 2 (Shanghai Metro), China
 Line 7 (Guangzhou Metro), China 
 South Island line, Hong Kong, China
 Line 4 (Wuhan Metro), Wuhan, China
 Taipa Line
 Paris Métro Line 6, France
 Lyublinsko-Dmitrovskaya line, Moscow, Russia 
 Barcelona Metro line 11, Barcelona, Spain
 Line 5 (Madrid Metro), Madrid, Spain
 Wilmington/Newark Line, SEPTA, Pennsylvania-Delaware, United States
 R Line (RTD), Denver, Colorado, United States

See also
 Green Line (disambiguation)